Meldon is a hamlet in West Devon, on the edge of Dartmoor in Devon, England. It is 4 km south-west of Okehampton. Its main features are the Meldon Quarry and Meldon Reservoir and the nearby Meldon Viaduct.

Quarries
Granite is still extracted from Meldon Quarry. The now disused Meldon Aplite Quarry has been designated as a Site of Special Scientific Interest because of its exposures of aplite and other rocks.

The Dartmoor Railway terminates at Meldon Quarry; the former continuation of the line to Tavistock and Plymouth continues as a cycle path. The former railway line crosses the West Okement River on the Meldon Viaduct just before reaching the quarry from the west.

Reservoir
The reservoir was formed by damming the West Okement River. It is about 1.2 km long and 300 metres wide, and extends from the West Okement valley into a small side valley.

Firing range
Immediately to the south-east is the area of the Okehampton military firing range, which is sometimes closed to the public. At other times, a footpath along the west side of the reservoir can be used to access the open moor.

Civil parish
The hamlet is now part of the civil parish of Okehampton Hamlets.

See also 
 Rail trail

References

External links 

 Meldon Community Page
 GENUKI/Devon: Okehampton 1850
  Devonshire 1841

Villages in Devon
Geology of Devon